Nikola Nosková (born 1 July 1997) is a Czech road cyclist and cyclo-cross racer, who currently rides for UCI Women's WorldTeam .

Career
As a junior, she competed on the road in the junior events at the 2014 UCI Road World Championships and 2015 UCI Road World Championships. 

She won the silver medal in the women's under-23 event at the 2016 UCI Cyclo-cross World Championships in Heusden-Zolder and took the bronze in the under-23 race on home soil at the 2017 UEC European Cyclo-cross Championships in Tábor. In 2017 she also won both the Czech National Road Race Championships and the Czech National Time Trial Championships.

At the 2018 European Road Cycling Championships in Brno, Czech Republic, Nosková won two medals on home soil, taking the bronze in the under-23 time trial before winning the under-23 road race title. In August 2018, the then-named  announced that she would join them for the 2019 season. She remained with the team until it folded during the 2020 season.

In September 2020, Nosková signed a contract with the   team.

References

External links

 prowomenscycling.com
 cyclingnews.com
 cyclingweekly.co.uk
 cyclingstage.com
 velonews.com
 caubergcyclocross.com

1997 births
Living people
Cyclo-cross cyclists
Czech female cyclists
Sportspeople from Jablonec nad Nisou
Cyclists at the 2014 Summer Youth Olympics
European Games competitors for the Czech Republic
Cyclists at the 2019 European Games
Youth Olympic gold medalists for the Czech Republic